Bidar South Assembly seat is one of the seats in Karnataka Legislative Assembly in India. It is a segment of Bidar Lok Sabha seat.

Members of Assembly 
 2008:	Bandeppa Kashempur, Janata Dal (Secular)

 2013:	Ashok Kheny, Karnataka Makkala Paksha

See also 
 List of constituencies of Karnataka Legislative Assembly

References 

Assembly constituencies of Karnataka
Bidar district